Willin Low is a restaurateur and chef in Singapore. His flagship restaurant, Wild Rocket, specializes in what Low describes as "mod sin" or modern Singaporean cuisine. Diners Club named Wild Rocket one of the top 50 restaurants in Asia.

Before entering the restaurant industry, Low practiced law for eight years.

References

Living people
Chinese chefs
Singaporean chefs
Singaporean businesspeople
Singaporean people of Teochew descent
20th-century Singaporean lawyers
Year of birth missing (living people)